WISEP J060738.65+242953.4 (designation is abbreviated to W0607+2429) is a brown dwarf of spectral class L8, located in the constellation Gemini at approximately 25 light-years from Earth.

Discovery
WISEP J060738.65+242953.4 was discovered in 2012 by Castro & Gizis from data collected by the Wide-field Infrared Survey Explorer (WISE) Earth-orbiting satellite — NASA infrared-wavelength  space telescope, whose mission lasted from December 2009 to February 2011. There are also precovery identifications of this object in Two Micron All-Sky Survey (2MASS) data (observation epoch 1998.11) and in the Sloan Digital Sky Survey (SDSS) (observation epoch 2006.98). In 2012 Castro & Gizis published a paper in The Astrophysical Journal, where they presented discovery of a newfound WISE L-type brown dwarf WISEP J060738.65+242953.4 (a single discovery, presented in the article).

Distance
Trigonometric parallax of WISEP J060738.65+242953.4 is not yet measured. Therefore, there are only distance estimates of this object, obtained by indirect — spectrophotometric — means (see table).

Non-trigonometric distance estimates are marked in italic.

Physical properties
WISEP J060738.65+242953.4 has a temperature of 1460 ± 90 K and bolometric luminosity  of 10−4.56 ± 0.09 Solar luminosities (the estimates are based on the object's spectral class (L8)). Mass estimates, determined from this temperature, are from 0.03 (for an assumed age of 0.5 Gyr) to 0.072 (for an assumed age of 10 Gyr) Solar masses, below the hydrogen-burning limit, which implies that WISEP J060738.65+242953.4 is not a true star, but only a substellar object.

While some researchers had claimed that WISEP J060738.65+242953.4 may be viewed from its pole, or may rotate slowly because of its narrow spectral lines, later work demonstrated that both of these claims were unlikely.  This latter study estimated that the size of the radio-emitting magnetosphere is approximately 107 m.

See also
 List of star systems within 20–25 light-years
 WISE 0031−3840 (L2 pec (blue))
 WISE 0049+0441 (L9)
 WISE 0206+2640 (L9 pec (red))
 WISE 1311+3629 (L5 pec (blue))
 WISE 1348+6603 (L9)
 WISE 1647+5632 (L9 pec (red))
 WISE 1830+4542 (L9)
 WISE 2327−2730 (L9)
 WISE 1800+0134 (L7.5)
 WISE 0047+6803 (L7.5 pec)
 WISE 0106+1518 (M8 pec)

References

Brown dwarfs
L-type stars
Gemini (constellation)
WISE objects